Che Ha is a village of in the Shap Sze Heung area of Sai Kung North, in Tai Po District, Hong Kong.

Administration
Che Ha is a recognized village under the New Territories Small House Policy.

History
At the time of the 1911 census, the population of Sheung Yeung was 73. The number of males was 33.

References

Further reading

External links

 Delineation of area of existing village Che Ha (Sai Kung North) for election of resident representative (2019 to 2022)

Villages in Tai Po District, Hong Kong
Sai Kung North